John Silvester may refer to:

John Silvester (writer), Australian journalist and crime writer
John Silvester (blacksmith) (1652–1722), English blacksmith at the Tower of London
John Silvester (lawyer) (1745–1822), English lawyer and Common Serjeant of London from 1790 to 1803

See also
John Sylvester (disambiguation)